Susan Fletcher (born 1979) is a British novelist.

Fletcher was born in Birmingham and studied Creative Writing at the University of East Anglia.

Her first novel, Eve Green, was published in 2004 by Fourth Estate, an imprint of HarperCollins. It features an eight-year-old girl who is sent to a new life in rural Wales. It won the 2004 Whitbread First Novel Award, the Authors' Club award and the Betty Trask Prize; it was also shortlisted for The LA Times Book Award and was picked for Channel 4's Richard and Judy Summer Reading list. Subsequent novels have been shortlisted for the John Llewellyn Rhys award, The Writers' Guild fiction award and the Romantic Novel of the Year award. Her novel Witch Light won the Saint Maur en Poche award 2013 in France.

Fletcher is now published by Virago, an imprint of Little, Brown Book Group. She has also worked as a Fellow of the Royal Literary Fund at the University of Worcester (2016–18). Her seventh novel, House of Glass, was released in November 2018.

Works

 Eve Green (2004)
 Oystercatchers (2007)
 Corrag (2010); also published as Witch Light and (in America) The Highland Witch
 The Silver Dark Sea (July 2012)
 A Little in Love (2014)
 Let Me Tell You About a Man I Knew (2016)
 House of Glass (November 2018)

References

External links 
 Articles by Susan Fletcher on the 5th Estate blog
 Books written by Susan Fletcher on Curtis Brown agency's website

1979 births
Living people
21st-century English novelists
English women novelists
Alumni of the University of East Anglia
Writers from Birmingham, West Midlands
Alumni of the University of York
Costa Book Award winners
21st-century English women writers